Venkatramaiah Shantha Kumari (born 5 February 1952) popularly called "Shanthakka" is the current Chief (Sanskrit: Pramukh Sanchalika) of the Hindu nationalist women's organisation Rashtra Sevika Samiti. She took charge as Chief in 2013.

Early life
Hailing from Bengaluru, Karnataka, she grew up in a household which actively practiced giving and devotion to the cause of the nation. Her father was active in the Quit India Movement (1942), her homemaker mother gave away all her jewellery following the call of Mahatma Gandhi. In 1968, when she was 16, Shantha Kumari came in contact with Rashtra Sevika Samiti. By 1969,  not only had she completed all required Rashtra Sevika Samiti training schedules, she was conducting a daily shakha at Wilson Garden, Bengaluru. Soon after, she was made the Chief Instructor. Within five years her devotion and ability led her to the office of Nagar Karyavahak (Town Chief/In-charge).

Career
In 1977, Bengaluru hosted an important Rashtra Sevika Samiti event where Shanthakka met the then Samiti Sarkaryavahika Vandaneeya Moushiji Lakshmi Bai Kelkar. Kelkar exhorted the young woman to devote more of her time and energy to Samiti activities. By 1978, Shanthakka had taken a decision-she would devote herself full-time to the Samiti, and will not marry. The same year saw her elevation to the office of Sahakaryavahika, Karnataka region.
In those days Samiti activists were not encouraged to adopt the semi-renunciate life style adopted by RSS pracharaks and travel as active field workers. They were expected to live within their families and work for the Samiti in various capacities. Shanthakka threw herself headlong into Samiti activities. The Samiti office ran out of the home of Rukminiamma, principal of Malleswaram Ladies Association College, who inspired and encouraged the young activist.
In 1991, V. Shantha Kumari became Sahakaryavahika, Southern region (Karnataka, Tamilnadu, Andhra Pradesh and Kerala). Her incessant hard work resulted in the Samiti's spread and greater visibility in southern India. She has been very dedicated to the cause of the Ramjanmabhoomi Temple. During the Ayodhya campaign in 1992, she was in the town accompanied by 200 Samiti activists from the southern states.

A teacher by profession, Shantha Kumari managed to strike a balance between professional goals and her dedication to the nation. While leaving for Ayodhya she wrote an unambiguous letter to her institution's management informing them of her active participation in the Ramjanmabhoomi movement; she told them to treat the letter as her resignation from her job in case they found her participation in the movement against the policies of the institution. On her return to Bengaluru she was pleasantly surprised by the warm welcome and public felicitation accorded to her by the institution. At the insistence of the management she decided to continue with her job.

In the early nineties Samiti members began to travel and work as field activists. In 1994, Shantha Kumari renounced home to live at the Samiti office at Bengaluru. In 1995, she resigned from her job and began to travel within Karnataka as a pracharika of the Samiti. 1996 onwards then Samiti Sarkaryavahika Pramila Tai Medhe took her under her wings. Her apprenticeship with Medhe gave her strong organizational skills. Her own facility for languages (English, Hindi, Kannada, Malayalam, Marathi, Tamil, Telugu) came in handy in communicating with varied audiences. The potential of her intensive campaign was noticed and she was made Sahakaryavahika in 1997.

Shantha Kumari holds a record of sorts-she has apprenticed with all her predecessors- Vandaneeya Moushiji Lakshmi Bai Kelkar, Saraswati Tai Apte, Usha Tai Chati and Pramila Tai Medhe. Her association with these pioneers exposed her to the accumulated wisdom of six decades in the context of the organization and training of a dedicated cadre of women activist, a challenge anywhere, more so in India.

Feminist views
Shantha Kumari said she believes the Rastra Sevika Samiti to be different from other women's organizations, specially those which take the western feminist approach. She says the Samiti aims to make women more strong physically, mentally and intellectually so they may realise their potential and use it to strengthen the nation, create and guide the power of good.

Her five years in office have resulted in greater visibility and diversification for the Samiti.

Further reading
Bacchetta, Paola. Gender in the Hindu Nation: RSS Women as Ideologues.  New Delhi: Women Unlimited, 2004, .

References

External links
- From Laxmibai Kelkar to V Shantha Kumari, here’s how RSS’ women’s wing shaped over the years

1952 births
Living people
Rashtriya Swayamsevak Sangh pracharaks
Hindutva
Rashtra Sevika Samiti members
People from Bangalore
Women in Karnataka politics